Hertford may refer to:

 Hertford, the county town of Hertfordshire
 Hertford Castle
 Hertford College, Oxford
 Hertford County, North Carolina
 Hertford, North Carolina, a town not located in Hertford County.

People
 Marquess of Hertford, a title in the Peerage of England
 Whit Hertford (born 1978), American actor and writer

Ships

See also
 Hartford (disambiguation)